Liberty County is a county in the U.S. state of Texas. As of the 2020 census, its population was 91,628. The county seat is Liberty. The county was created in 1831 as a municipality in Mexico as Villa de la Santísima Trinidad de la Libertad by commissioner José Francisco Madero and organized as a county of the Republic of Texas in 1837. Its name was anglisized as Liberty based off the ideal of American liberty.

Liberty County is included in the Houston-The Woodlands-Sugar Land, TX metropolitan statistical area.

Geography

The Trinity River flows through this county, dividing the county roughly in half. The river begins on the northern border of Liberty County, forming the San Jacinto - Polk County line through the Liberty County line. The east fork of the San Jacinto River flows through far northeast parts of the county, flowing through Cleveland. Tarkington Bayou begins in the Sam Houston National Forest in San Jacinto County, working its way south through northeast and east Liberty County and joining other feeders, before traveling into Harris County and emptying into Galveston Bay. The highest point in Liberty County is "Davis Hill", the roof of a salt dome in the northern part of the county.

Adjacent counties
 Polk County (north)
 Hardin County (east)
 Jefferson County (southeast)
 Chambers County (south)
 Harris County (southwest)
 Montgomery County (west)
 San Jacinto County (northwest)

National protected areas
 Big Thicket National Preserve (part)
 Trinity River National Wildlife Refuge

Communities

Cities

 Ames
 Cleveland
 Daisetta
 Dayton
 Dayton Lakes
 Devers
 Hardin
 Liberty (county seat)
 Mont Belvieu (mostly in Chambers County)
 Nome
 North Cleveland
 Old River-Winfree (mostly in Chambers County)
 Plum Grove

Town
 Kenefick

Census-designated place
 Big Thicket Lake Estates (partly in Polk County)
 Hull

Unincorporated communities

 Dolen
 Eastgate
 Hightower
 Hoop and Holler
 Macedonia
 Moss Bluff
 Moss Hill
 Rayburn
 Raywood
 Romayor
 Rye
 Stilson
 Tarkington Prairie

Demographics

Note: the U.S. Census Bureau treats Hispanic/Latino as an ethnic category. This table excludes Latinos from the racial categories and assigns them to a separate category. Hispanics/Latinos can be of any race.

As of the census of 2000, 70,154 people, 23,242 households, and 17,756 families resided in the county. The population density was 60 people per square mile (23/km2). The 26,359 housing units averaged 23 per square mile (9/km2). The racial makeup of the county was 78.90% White, 12.82% African American, 0.47% Native American, 0.32% Asian, 6.06% from other races, and 1.43% from two or more races. About 10.92% of the population was Hispanic or Latino of any race.

Of the 23,242 households, 38.10% had children under 18 living with them, 60.50% were married couples living together, 11.40% had a female householder with no husband present, and 23.60% were not families. About 20.40% of all households were made up of individuals, and 8.90% had someone living alone who was 65 or older. The average household size was 2.80 and the average family size was 3.23.

In the county, the population was distributed as 27.60% under18, 9.20% from 18 to 24, 31.60% from 25 to 44, 21.40% from 45 to 64, and 10.30% who were 65 years of age or older. The median age was 34 years. For every 100 females, there were 95.70 males. For every 100 females age 18 and over, there were 92.40 males.

The median income for a household in the county was $38,361, and for a family was $43,744. Males had a median income of $37,957 versus $22,703 for females. The per capita income for the county was $15,539. About 11.10% of families and 14.30% of the population were below the poverty line, including 18.30% of those under age 18 and 15.00% of those age 65 or over.

Of Liberty County's residents, 8.8% have a college degree, the lowest percentage of any U.S. county with a population exceeding 50,000.

Government and politics
Liberty County, formerly strongly Democratic like much of the rest of Texas before the mid-20th century, has trended sharply Republican in recent years. As is the case with most rural Texas counties, the Republican margin of victory has largely increased since Bill Clinton won the county in the 1990s.

United States Congress

Texas Legislature

Texas Senate
 District 3: Robert Nichols (R)- first elected in 2006

Texas House of Representatives
District 18: Ernest Bailes (R) - first elected in 2016

Liberty County elected officials

Economy
Around 1995, the economy of Liberty County was mainly focused on agriculture and oil. As of that year, the economy of Liberty County was struggling. At that time, the Texas Department of Criminal Justice had established four correctional facilities (Cleveland, Henley, Hightower, and Plane) in the county within a six-year span. As of 1995, the facilities employed 1,045 employees and contributed $22 million in the county's annual payroll. Since Cleveland is a privately operated facility, the county receives tax revenue from the prison's operation.

Education
School districts include:
 Cleveland ISD (portions of the district extends into other counties)
 Dayton Independent School District (ISD) (portions of the district extends into another county)
 Devers ISD
 Hardin ISD
 Hull-Daisetta ISD
 Liberty ISD
 Tarkington ISD

Sections in Dayton, Devers, Hardin, Hull-Daisetta, and Liberty school districts are assigned to Lee College. Sections in the Cleveland and Tarkington school districts are assigned to Lone Star College.

Judge and Mrs. Price Daniel donated  of land for the purpose of establishing a library on September 27, 1973. Construction began in the fall of 1975; by then, $700,000 had been raised through private donations. The library opened on May 14, 1977.

Infrastructure
Outside of the city limits, ambulance services are provided by contract through Allegiance EMS. Fire protection is provided mostly through volunteer fire departments, four of which in Liberty County are funded by emergency services districts.

Police services 
The headquarters of the Liberty County Sheriff's Office, which serves unincorporated areas and supplements police forces of incorporated areas, is within the city of Liberty.
Most incorporated areas operate their own police departments, including Cleveland, Daisetta, Dayton, Kenefick, and Liberty.

Liberty County also has a constable for each of its six precincts and deputies assigned to each.

Fire services 

Incorporated cities of Cleveland and Liberty operate their own fire departments staffed by a combination of paid and volunteer members. Both departments cover territory outside their respective city limits.

Fire departments serving unincorporated areas:
 Ames VFD 1 station
 Cleveland VFD 2 stations (Covering areas inside the City of Cleveland and North Cleveland, and unincorporated Liberty County)
 Cypress Lakes VFD 1 station
 Dayton VFD 2 stations (covering areas inside the City of Dayton, and unincorporated Liberty County)
 Devers VFD 1 station
 Hardin VFD 1 station (covering areas inside the City of Hardin, and unincorporated Liberty County)
 Highway 321 VFD 1 station
 Hull-Daisetta VFD 1 station (covering areas inside the City of Daisetta, and unincorporated Liberty County)
 Kenefick VFD 1 station (covering areas inside the City of Kenefick, and unincorporated Liberty County)
 Liberty VFD 1 station (covering areas inside the City of Liberty, and unincorporated Liberty County)
 Moss Bluff VFD 1 station
 North Liberty County VFD 1 station
 Plum Grove VFD 1 station (covering areas inside the City of Plum Grove, and unincorporated Liberty County)
 Raywood VFD 1 Station
 Tarkington VFD 2 stations
 Westlake VFD 1 station
 Woodpecker VFD 1 station

Emergency medical services 

Emergency medical services are provided by Allegiance EMS, with the only exception being inside the City of Liberty, for which service is provided by the City of Liberty Fire and EMS Department.

Corrections
The Texas Department of Criminal Justice operates one women's prison and two women's state jails, all co-located in an unincorporated area. The Cleveland Unit, a prison for men privately operated by the GEO Group, Inc. on behalf of the TDCJ, is in Cleveland.

Cleveland opened in September 1989. Hightower opened in March 1990. Henley and Plane opened in May 1995. Also, in 1992 Community Education Centers opened a private detention center under federal contract with the United States Marshals Service for 372 beds, co-located at the old decommissioned Liberty County Jail.

As of 1995, of all Texas counties, Liberty County had the fourth-largest number of state prisons and jails, after Walker, Brazoria, and Coryell Counties.

Transportation

Major highways
  U.S. Highway 59
  Interstate 69 is currently under construction and will follow the current route of U.S. 59 in most places.
  U.S. Highway 90
  State Highway 61
 State Highway 99 (Grand Parkway)
  State Highway 105
  State Highway 146
  State Highway 321

Aviation
Two general aviation airports are located in unincorporated sections of the county.
 Liberty Municipal Airport is located east of Liberty.
 Cleveland Municipal Airport is located east of Cleveland.
The Houston Airport System stated that Liberty County is within the primary service area of George Bush Intercontinental Airport, an international airport in Houston in Harris County.

Toll roads

The Liberty County Toll Road Authority does not operate any toll roads at present. In July, 2007, Liberty County created the Liberty County Toll Road Authority to have a say in any and all future toll-road projects located within the county.

Notable people
 William Fields (1810-1858), American politician
 Bobby Seale, co-founder of the Black Panther Party

See also

 List of museums in the Texas Gulf Coast
 National Register of Historic Places listings in Liberty County, Texas
 Recorded Texas Historic Landmarks Liberty County

References

External links
 Liberty County government's website
 Liberty County in Handbook of Texas Online from The University of Texas at Austin
 The Liberty Courier -- Conservative Twist, Local news Mainly focuses on politics in Liberty County Texas.
 Cleveland Advocate Cleveland Area Newspaper, covers north east Liberty County.
 Liberty County, TXGenWeb Focuses on genealogical research of Liberty County.
 Liberty County Libertarian Party

 
1836 establishments in the Republic of Texas
Populated places established in 1836
Greater Houston